The Democratic Action Party (PAD) is a liberal political party in Moldova.

Overview
The PAD was founded in 2011 by ex-member of the Liberal Democratic Party Mihai Godea. The party was founded as the social movement Alternative Democratic Platform. The Founding Congress took place on 6 November 2011 in Chişinău. Mihai Godea was elected as chairman of the new party.

References

External links
Official website
www.e-democracy.md

Liberal parties in Moldova